De Inventione is a handbook for orators that Cicero composed when he was still a young man. Quintilian tells us that Cicero considered the work rendered obsolete by his later writings. Originally four books in all, only two have survived into modern times. It is also credited with the first recorded use of the term "liberal arts" or artes liberales, though whether Cicero coined the term is unclear. The text also defines the concept of dignitas: dignitas est alicuius honesta et cultu et honore et verecundia digna auctoritas.

At the request of William of Santo Stefano, De Inventione was translated into Old French by John of Antioch in 1282.

References

External links

 Translation by C.D. Yonge
 Latin Text

Works by Cicero on oratory